Covert Affairs is an American spy drama created by Matt Corman and Chris Ord, which originally aired on the USA Network. Piper Perabo and Christopher Gorham star as Annie Walker and Auggie Anderson, two CIA agents working together on missions all around the world with the help of their bosses, Joan (Kari Matchett) and Arthur (Peter Gallagher), and associate Jai (Sendhil Ramamurthy). Annie must also deal with her home life and her sister Danielle (Anne Dudek).

The first season of this one-hour drama premiered on Tuesday, July 13, 2010, following White Collar, and ended on September 14, 2010. The show was renewed for a second season on August 19, 2010; the second season started airing on June 7, 2011. New episodes aired until August 9, and the last six aired from November 1 until December 6, 2011. The show was renewed for a third season, which began on July 10, 2012, and consists of 16 episodes. On September 25, 2012, the show was renewed for a 16-episode fourth season, which began airing July 16, 2013. On October 3, 2013, the series was renewed for a 16-episode fifth season, which premiered on June 24, 2014. On January 6, 2015, it was reported that USA had opted to cancel the show.

Series overview

Episodes

Season 1 (2010) 
Season one of Covert Affairs comprises eleven episodes.  With the exception of the pilot episode, all Season 1 episode titles are also titles of songs by Led Zeppelin.

Season 2 (2011) 
The show was renewed for a second season on August 19, 2010. Production began in March 2011, and the season premiered on June 7, 2011. Ben Lawson appeared in several episodes as Dr. Scott Weiss, a physician at a local emergency room. Rena Sofer appeared in multiple episodes as Gina, Arthur Campbell's ex-wife. Jaimie Alexander portrayed Reva Kline, a former analyst who begins working in the field, in various episodes throughout the season. Oded Fehr reprised his role as Eyal Lavin, a Mossad agent, in two episodes. Additional guest stars included Santiago Cabrera, Tim Guinee, Rebecca Mader, Benito Martinez, and Peter Stormare. The first half of the season, consisting of 10 episodes, concluded on August 9, 2011, while the remaining six episodes began airing on November 1, 2011.  All Season 2 episode titles are also titles of songs by R.E.M.

Season 3 (2012) 
On September 15, 2011, USA Network renewed the series for a 16-episode third season, which premiered July 10, 2012.  Sarah Clarke began a recurring role in the first episode as Lena Smith, a highly regarded agent who serves as Annie's mentor when Annie is transferred to a new section.  Oded Fehr will resume his recurring role as Mossad agent Eyal Lavin in both the summer and fall seasons, and Daniella Alonso will recur as Suzanne Wilkins, a DPD therapist.  Rena Sofer will return as Gina, Arthur's ex-wife, in one episode.  Devin Kelley returned as Parker, Auggie's girlfriend, and Brendan Hines appeared in the third episode as Wade, a man who works alongside Parker in the Peace Corps.  The series also introduced British actor Richard Coyle in a recurring role as Simon Fischer, a British businessman to whom Annie is assigned, who may also be a Russian spy.  All Season 3 episode titles are also titles of songs by David Bowie.

Season 4 (2013) 
On September 25, 2012, the series was renewed for a 16-episode fourth season. Hill Harper will join the cast as a series regular, playing a station chief with higher aspirations but questionable motives, looking to Annie and Auggie for assistance. Season 4 began airing July 16, 2013.  All Season 4 episode titles are taken from names of songs by The Pixies.

Season 5 (2014) 
On October 3, 2013, the series was renewed for a 16-episode fifth season.  Australian actor Nicholas Bishop joined the main cast as a special forces officer turned billionaire with whom Annie will have a complex relationship.  Actress Amy Jo Johnson recurred as a counter-terrorism expert who clashes with Auggie. Actor Oded Fehr reprised his role as Mossad agent Eyal Lavin for "at least one [episode]." Kenny Johnson recurred as James Decker, an old friend of Auggie's from his time in the military. All Season 5 episode titles are taken from names of songs by Pavement.

Home video releases

References

External links 
 
 
 
 

Lists of American espionage television series episodes